Peter Zinner (July 24, 1919 – November 13, 2007) was an Austrian-American film editor. Following nearly fifteen years of uncredited work as an assistant sound editor, Zinner received credits on more than fifty films from 1959 to 2006. His most influential films are likely The Godfather and The Godfather Part II, both of which appear on a 2012 listing of the 75 best edited films of all time compiled by the Motion Picture Editors Guild.

Early life 
He was born in Vienna, Austria, and studied music there in the Theresianum and at the Max Reinhardt Seminar. Following the occupation of Austria by Nazi Germany in 1938, Zinner and his parents, who were Jewish, emigrated. They went first to the Philippines, and in 1940 to the United States. As a young man, Zinner worked in Los Angeles as a taxi driver and occasionally as a pianist at screenings of silent films.

Career 
In 1943, Zinner became an apprentice film editor at the 20th Century Fox Studios. He became an assistant sound-effects editor at Universal Studios in 1947. Much of his work as an assistant sound and music editor is uncredited; he worked with composers Miklós Rózsa, Jacques Ibert, André Previn, Adolph Deutsch, and Bernard Herrmann on films including Quo Vadis (1951), Singin' in the Rain (1952), The Band Wagon (1953), Gigi (1958), and Gene Kelly's experimental Invitation to the Dance (1956). His first credit as a music editor was for For the First Time (1959); his other credits for music include X-15 (1961), the US version of King Kong vs. Godzilla (1962), and Lord Jim (1965).

Zinner had wanted to move into film editing, and following his music-editing work with producer-director Richard Brooks on Lord Jim, Brooks asked him to edit The Professionals (1967) and In Cold Blood (1967). Zinner's work on The Professionals was nominated for an American Cinema Editors Eddie Award. By 1970 he had become sufficiently established as an editor that he was asked to edit the latter half of The Godfather; William H. Reynolds edited the first half. The film, which was directed by Francis Ford Coppola, has been very successful with critics and at the box office. One of its sequences has become an icon of film editing. As critic Tony Sloman described it in 2007, "As the newly born child of Michael Corleone is christened, the young Don Michael, heir to the murdered Don Vito Corleone, wreaks his revenge on his enemies, eliminating them to the soundtrack of the priest's baby-blessing and the church's organ music. It is unquestionably one of the most dramatically satisfying and audience-shattering sequences in contemporary cinema, a magnificent example of the art of motion-picture editing, the craft of story-telling by montage. The editor of the sequence was Peter Zinner." Director Frank Pierson said, "...That's the kind of thing that he was brilliant at, and it's become a classic sequence in movie history."

Zinner was nominated for the Academy Award for Best Film Editing three times, for his work on The Godfather (1972), The Deer Hunter (1978; directed by Michael Cimino), and An Officer and a Gentleman {1982; directed by Taylor Hackford}. He won the Oscar, a BAFTA, and an Eddie for The Deer Hunter. His work (with Barry Malkin and Richard Marks) on The Godfather Part II (1974) earned a second BAFTA nomination. Zinner was nominated four times for Emmy Awards, and won for the miniseries War and Remembrance (1988) and for Citizen Cohn (1992). His peers in the American Cinema Editors honored him with six Eddie nominations of which he won four.

His many other film editing credits include Blake Edwards' Gunn, Foolin' Around, Darling Lili, Dirty Pictures, Crazy Joe, Mahogany, A Star is Born (with Barbra Streisand) and Somebody Has to Shoot the Picture. 

In 1990 he played the role of an admiral in the film The Hunt for Red October. Zinner also produced four films. He directed The Salamander (1981) with Anthony Quinn.

Personal life 
Zinner had married his wife Christa, a German-born photographer and artist, in 1959. Their daughter, Katina Zinner, is also a film editor as well as an artist. Zinner died on November 13, 2007, aged 88, in Santa Monica, California, from non-Hodgkin lymphoma.  His funeral was held on January 5, 2008.

Filmography

Film

Television

Awards and nominations

References

External links
 "Obituary: Peter Zinner, Film editor who helped to make The Godfather and The Deer Hunter", The Times November 20, 2007. Online version retrieved July 5, 2008.

1919 births
2007 deaths
Jewish emigrants from Austria to the United States after the Anschluss
American film editors
Best Editing BAFTA Award winners
Best Film Editing Academy Award winners
Deaths from cancer in California
Deaths from non-Hodgkin lymphoma
Emmy Award winners
American taxi drivers
People from Santa Monica, California